Frederick Richard Wittmann (3 February 1901 – 8 October 1987) was an Australian rules footballer who played with Carlton in the Victorian Football League (VFL).

Notes

External links 

Dick Wittmann's profile at Blueseum

1901 births
1987 deaths
Australian rules footballers from Victoria (Australia)
Carlton Football Club players